{{taxobox
| image = Cleptes semiauratus cuckoo wasp.jpg
| image_caption = Cleptes semiauratus
| regnum = Animalia
| phylum = Arthropoda
| classis = Insecta
| ordo = Hymenoptera
| familia = Chrysididae
| subfamilia = Cleptinae
| genus = Cleptes
| genus_authority = Latreille, 1802
| subdivision_ranks = Species
| subdivision = Several, including:
 Cleptes semicyaneus
 Cleptes striatipleuris
| synonyms = 
 Chrysocleptes (Moczar, 1962)
 Holcocleptes (Moczar, 1962)
 Leiocleptes (Moczar, 1962)
 Lustrina' (Kurian, 1955)
 Melanocleptes (Moczar, 1962)
 Neocleptes (Kimsey, 1981)
 Oxycleptes (Moczar, 1962)
 Zimmermannia (Moczar, 1962)
}}Cleptes'' is a genus of cuckoo wasps in the subfamily Cleptinae.

References 

 Ducke, A. (1902). Ein neue südamerikanische Cleptes-Art. Zeitschr. Syst. Hymenopterol. Dipterol., 2, 91–93.
 Rosa, P., Forshage, M., Paukkunen, J. & Soon, V. 2015. Cleptes pallipes Lepeletier synonym of Cleptes semiauratus (Linnaeus) and description of Cleptes striatipleuris sp. nov. (Hymenoptera: Chrysididae, Cleptinae). Zootaxa, 4039(4), pages 543–552, 
 Wei, N.-s.; Rosa, P.; Xu, Z.-f. 2013: Revision of the Chinese Cleptes (Hymenoptera, Chrysididae) with description of new species. ZooKeys, 362, pages 55–96,

External links 
 

 

 Cleptes at insectoid.info

Cleptinae
Hymenoptera genera